Greater Shepparton Secondary College (GSSC) is a Public High School in Shepparton, Victoria, Australia. It opened in 2020 as an amalgamation of four previous high schools in the region. The high schools main campus is located at the site of the previous Shepparton High School, and was opened at this site in 2022.

History 
The GSSC was created from the Shepparton Education plan. This was a result of lower educational outcomes from students in the Shepparton region when compared to similar schools across Victoria. The school officially opened in 2020 by taking over the four public high schools located in Shepparton and nearby Mooroopna. The four schools that were amalgamated were: Shepparton High School, McGuire College, Wanganui Park Secondary College and Mooroopna Secondary College

During the construction of the main GSSC campus students have attended their classes away from the main site and have been located at the sites of the previous high schools in Shepparton and Mooroopna, depending upon their year level and classes. Other campuses used by GSSC include a small campus located Invergordon. After the scheduled opening of the main campus in 2022, it is expected that the additional campuses will be closed permanently.

Controversy 
The creation of the school and the location of the school at the site of the previous Shepparton High School has created opposition within the Shepparton community. With those is opposition to the project suggesting the location is not big enough for the expected 3000 students. Other arguments include the idea that the increased funding for the GSSC could have been better split between the four existing schools.

References 

Public high schools in Victoria (Australia)
Shepparton
2020 establishments in Australia
Educational institutions established in 2020